Nikola Simić (born 30 July 1981) is a Serbian professional footballer who plays as an attacking midfielder.

Career
While playing for Javor Ivanjica, Simić was the fourth-highest scorer in the 2008–09 Serbian SuperLiga with 12 goals. He subsequently signed for OFK Beograd in the summer of 2009. Over the next two seasons with the Romantičari, Simić made 50 appearances and scored eight goals in the top flight.

In July 2011, Simić moved to Israeli Premier League club Hapoel Acre. He made just two league appearances for the side, before returning to his country and signing with newly promoted Serbian SuperLiga club Radnički Kragujevac in September 2011.

Honours
Javor Ivanjica
 Serbian First League: 2007–08

External links
 
 
 
 

Association football midfielders
Egaleo F.C. players
Expatriate footballers in Bosnia and Herzegovina
Expatriate footballers in Greece
Expatriate footballers in Israel
Expatriate footballers in Montenegro
First League of Serbia and Montenegro players
FK Borac Čačak players
FK Čelik Nikšić players
FK Javor Ivanjica players
FK Kolubara players
FK Radnički 1923 players
FK Zemun players
Hapoel Acre F.C. players
Israeli Premier League players
Montenegrin First League players
NK Čelik Zenica players
OFK Beograd players
Premier League of Bosnia and Herzegovina players
Serbia and Montenegro expatriate footballers
Serbia and Montenegro expatriate sportspeople in Greece
Serbia and Montenegro footballers
Serbian expatriate footballers
Serbian expatriate sportspeople in Bosnia and Herzegovina
Serbian expatriate sportspeople in Israel
Serbian expatriate sportspeople in Montenegro
Serbian First League players
Serbian footballers
Serbian SuperLiga players
Sportspeople from Valjevo
Super League Greece players
1981 births
Living people